Whitethroat may refer to:

Birds
 Birds in the genus Curruca
 Desert whitethroat (Curruca minula), indigenous to Asia from Iran to China
 Lesser whitethroat (Curruca curruca), indigenous to Europe
 Hume's whitethroat (Curruca althaea), indigenous to Southwestern and Central Asia
 Common whitethroat (Curruca communis), often known simply as "whitethroat", found in Europe, Asia, and Africa

Other uses
 HMCS Whitethroat, a minelayer

Animal common name disambiguation pages